Sarver (Jewish: Occupational name for a caterer from Yiddish sarver "one who serves") may refer to:

People
Bruce Sarver (1962–2005), American drag racer
Michael Sarver (born 1981), American singer
Robert Sarver (born 1961), American businessman and majority owner of the Phoenix Suns

Other uses
Sarver, Pennsylvania, U.S.
Holt v. Sarver, 1969 U.S. Supreme Court case
Ned and Sandy Sarver, characters in the Dean Koontz novel Strangers

Yiddish-language surnames
Occupational surnames